Liam Beckett MBE (born 17 July 1951) is a Northern Irish former football manager and player, who now works as a pundit and radio broadcaster.

Playing career
Starting his career after a five-year plumbing apprenticeship, Beckett won an Irish League title and Carlsberg Cup with Crusaders, before transferring to Drogheda United in December 1973. In 1975 he moved to Coleraine, before re-joining Crusaders in October 1979. However, he only remained at the club for nine days, returning to Coleraine after buying licensed premises in his hometown of Ballymoney. His playing career ended with Coleraine in 1981.

Managerial career
Beckett coached at Carrick Rangers in the early 1990s, before managing hometown club Ballymoney United. He later managed Cliftonville and Institute.

Broadcasting career
Since leaving management behind, Beckett has frequently worked as a sports broadcaster on BBC Radio Ulster for Northern Irish football and motorcycle racing, particularly road racing. However, since July 2018, he has focused solely on football due to a spate of accidents in road racing, particularly the death of William Dunlop, given his closeness to the Dunlop racing family. Beckett had also worked as a mechanic and served as mentor for William's father Robert Dunlop.

Honours
In December 2017, Beckett was awarded an MBE in the New Year Honours list for his service to the Northern Irish voluntary sector and sport.

References

Living people
1951 births
Crusaders F.C. players
Coleraine F.C. players
Drogheda United F.C. players
Institute F.C. managers
Moyola Park F.C. managers
Ballymoney United F.C. managers
Cliftonville F.C. managers
NIFL Premiership players
League of Ireland players
Members of the Order of the British Empire
Association football fullbacks
Association footballers from Northern Ireland
Football managers from Northern Ireland